Eight Days Away is the debut studio album by Australian punk rock band One Dollar Short. It was released in May 2002 and peaked at number 7 on the ARIA Charts.

Reception
Steve from Punk News gave the album 4 out of 5 saying "Eight Days Away is an album loaded with catchy pop punk with an emo edge but it's not quite emo-punk... The second track 'Is This the Part?' has been getting an enormous amount of airplay throughout Australia. This song is pure pop punk, with a backing of vocal harmonies and contains some catchy hooks. The subject matter, as you can guess, is mainly relationships but it is written in a thoughtful and mature way and the best of these songs is 'Satellite'. This is pretty fast, the intro is reminiscent of early Blink 182 and the song contains some delicious melodies." Steve concluded saying "One thing I did find with this album was that I wasn't sure which song I was listening to and the songs seem to suffer from a similar structure but it was an enjoyable disc and I recommend it to those who enjoy pop-punk but with a slight spin on it."

Track listing 
 "Shots Were Fired (Bloodstains)"	
 "Is This the Part?"	
 "The Letter"	
 "Unsung Hero"	
 "Silence"	
 "Ten Years"	
 "Another Day Away"	
 "Satellite"	
 "Colour Red"	
 "Boardgame"	
 "A Theme for New Years..."
 "Silver Spoons" 	
 "Not Pretty Enough" 
 
Deluxe Edition
 Video 1 - Mixing in Studio	
 Video 2 - Producer Interview	
 Video 3 - Live Concert Footage	
 Video 4 - On the Road/Touring	
 Video 5 - "Is This the Part?"

Charts

Release history

References

2002 debut albums
Mushroom Records albums
One Dollar Short albums